Metzneria ehikeella is a moth of the family Gelechiidae. It is widely distributed from central and northern Europe to the Ural Mountains. It is also present in North Africa, Turkey, the Caucasus, the Near East and Central Asia.

The wingspan is 15–18 mm. Adults are on wing in June and July.

The larvae feed on Centaurea scabiosa.

References

Moths described in 1954
Metzneria
Moths of Europe
Insects of Turkey